Social Outsiders in Nazi Germany is a book edited by Robert Gellately and Nathan Stoltzfus.  It is a collection of essays offering the history of those branded "social outsiders" in Nazi Germany.

It was published by Princeton University Press as a 320-page hardcover and paperback in 2001.

External links
Social Outsiders in Nazi Germany at the publisher's site.
Genocide as a Category of Analysis: Social Outsiders in Nazi Germany reviewed by Rachel T. Greenwald (History, University of Wyoming) in German Politics & Society, Vol. 20, No. 4, Issue 65, Winter 2002 .

2001 non-fiction books
21st-century history books
History books about Nazi Germany
Princeton University Press books